Martha Sarah Kahui Bragg (30 March 1895–26 May 1975) was a New Zealand dairy farmer and a voluntary child welfare worker. Of Māori descent, she identified with the Ngai Tahu (South Island) iwi and is remembered for fostering or adopting many children, successfully raising 38 young people through her own efforts and actively supported by her Māori community.

References

   

1895 births
1975 deaths
New Zealand farmers
New Zealand women farmers
Ngāi Tahu people
New Zealand Māori farmers
People from Stewart Island
New Zealand Māori people